Copelatus camerunensis is a species of diving beetle. It is part of the genus Copelatus in the subfamily Copelatinae of the family Dytiscidae. It was described by Guignot in 1941.

References

camerunensis
Beetles described in 1941